The Warden is a British television mini-series broadcast by the BBC in 1951 in six parts. An adaptation by Cedric Wallis of Anthony Trollope's 1855 novel The Warden, it was produced by Campbell Logan and sets were designed by Roy Oxley. Cast included J.H. Roberts, Thea Holme, Lockwood West, Avice Landone, David Markham, Arthur Hambling, Christopher Steele, Arthur Wontner, Lucille Lisle and Horace Sequiera, with Leonard Sachs as the narrator.

The series was broadcast live and is lost.

References

External links
 

1951 British television series debuts
1951 British television series endings
1950s British drama television series
Television shows based on British novels
Television series set in the 19th century
BBC television dramas
Black-and-white British television shows
English-language television shows
Live television series
Lost television shows
1950s British television miniseries